Nativity with St Elizabeth and the Infant John the Baptist is a c.1512-1513 oil on panel painting by Correggio, now in the Pinacoteca di Brera in Milan, which acquired it at an auction in Paris in 1913. 

It was painted during the artist's stay in Mantua, with heavy influence from Mantegna's Adoration of the Magi. However, its commissioner and original location are both unknown, though the latter was probably a home rather than a church. In the 17th century it was recorded as being in the collection of cardinal Ludovico Ludovisi in Rome, before going on the art market and ending up in the collection of Benigno Crespi.

References

1513 paintings
Religious paintings by Correggio
Paintings in the collection of the Pinacoteca di Brera
Nativity of Jesus in art
Paintings depicting John the Baptist
Paintings of Elizabeth (biblical figure)